The 304th Infantry Brigade was a formation of the British Army organised from surplus Royal Artillery (RA) personnel retrained as infantry towards the end of the Second World War.

Origin
By the end of 1944, 21st Army Group was suffering a severe manpower shortage, particularly among the infantry.  At the same time the German Luftwaffe was suffering from such shortages of pilots, aircraft and fuel that serious aerial attacks on the United Kingdom could be discounted. In January 1945 the War Office began to reorganise surplus anti-aircraft and coastal artillery regiments in the UK into infantry battalions, primarily for line of communication and occupation duties in North West Europe, thereby releasing trained infantry for frontline service. The 304th Brigade was one of seven brigades formed from these new units.

Composition
The 304th Infantry Brigade was formed on 22 January 1945 by conversion of the Headquarters of 38th Light Anti-Aircraft Brigade within the 2nd Anti-Aircraft Group. It was commanded by Brigadier C.A.H. Chadwick, followed by Brigadier F.W. Sanders from 24 May 1945, and comprised the following  Territorial Army RA units:

 630th (Essex) Infantry Regiment, Royal Artillery formed by 28th (Essex) Searchlight Regiment RA (TA).
 637th (The Northamptonshire Regiment) Infantry Regiment, Royal Artillery formed by 50th Searchlight Regiment RA (TA) (The Northamptonshire Regiment), which had originally been converted from the 4th Battalion Northamptonshire Regiment
 638th (Royal Northumberland Fusiliers) Infantry Regiment, Royal Artillery formed by 53rd (Royal Northumberland Fusiliers) Searchlight Regiment RA (TA), which had originally been converted from 5th Battalion, Royal Northumberland Fusiliers.

Service
After infantry training, including a short period attached to the 55th (West Lancashire) Infantry Division, the 304th Brigade was sent to Norway in June 1945 following the liberation of that country (Operation Doomsday).

Notes

References
 Lionel Ellis, History of the Second World War: United Kingdom Military Series: Victory in the West, Volume II: The Defeat of Germany, London: HMSO, 1968/Uckfield: Naval & Military, 2004, .

External sources
 British Military History website
 Land Forces of Britain, The Empire and Commonwealth
 The Royal Artillery 1939–45 
 The Patriot Files
 BBC WW2 People's War

Military units and formations established in 1945
Infantry brigades of the British Army in World War II